Zwei himmlische Dickschädel is a 1974 German comedy film directed by Werner Jacobs and starring Klaus Löwitsch, Reiner Schöne and Franziska Oehme. A mayor who rules his hometown autocratically is challenged by the arrival of an idealistic young priest.

Selected cast

External links

1974 films
1974 comedy films
German comedy films
West German films
1970s German-language films
Films directed by Werner Jacobs
Films about Catholic priests
Films set in Bavaria
Constantin Film films
1970s German films